Paweł Ryszard Mikołajuw (born 2 December 1978), also known as Popek, Popek Monster and Król Albanii (King of Albania), is a Polish rapper and professional mixed martial arts fighter. In 2000, together with such rappers as Bosski Roman, Tadek, Pomidor and Kali founded the group Firma. Popek creates music from the border of dubstep, grime and gangsta rap.

Popek left his family home and dropped out of school at the age of 14. He speaks Polish, English and German.

Solo activities began in 2007, Popek has since released three albums, including one self-released. The album Monster was certified Gold in Poland and the Czech Republic. Firma has recorded 6 albums, Popek however was not involved in the production of the album NieLegalne Rytmy: Kontynuacja.

He collaborated with such artists as Tiggy Smith Chronik, Krept and Konan, Big Narstie, JME, Professor Green, Jędker, Sokół, Peja, Virus Syndicate, Tempa T, P Money, Devlin, Wiley, Małolat, The Game, Sean Price, Stitches. and Big H.

Popek is also known for extreme behavior, including getting his eyeballs tattooed and being hung on hooks for the video of Pain be My Guest.

Discography 
 With Firma

 Solo albums

Monster 2 (2014)

Mixed martial arts record

| Loss
| align=center| 4-5
| Norman Parke
| TKO (hand injury)
| FAME 13: Nitro vs. Unboxall
| 
| align=center| 1
| align=center| 0:37
| Gliwice, Poland
|
|-
| Win
| align=center| 4-4
| Damian Zduńczyk
| Submission (armbar)
| FAME MMA 7: Popek vs. Stifler
| 
| align=center| 1
| align=center| 1:46
| Łódź, Poland
|
|-
| Loss
| align=center| 3-4
| Erko Jun
| TKO (punches)
| | KSW 45: The Return To Wembley
|
| align=center| 2
| align=center| 2:08
| London, England
|
|-
| Loss
| align=center| 3-3
| Tomasz Oświeciński
| TKO (punches)
| KSW 41
| 
| align=center| 2
| align=center| 2:58
| Katowice, Poland
|
|-
| Win
| align=center| 3-2
| Robert Burneika
| TKO (submission to punches)
| KSW 39
| 
| align=center| 1
| align=center| 0:45
| Warsaw, Poland
|
|-
| Loss
| align=center| 2-2
| Mariusz Pudzianowski
| TKO (punches)
| KSW 37
| 
| align=center| 1
| align=center| 1:20
| Krakow, Poland
|
|-
| Loss
| align=center| 2-1
| Sander Duyvis
| TKO (punches)
| FX3: Fight Night 9
| 
| align=center| 1
| align=center| 4:04
| Reading, England
|
|-
| Win
| align=center| 2-0
| Kev Sims
| KO (punches)
| Cage Rage 26
| 
| align=center| 1
| align=center| 1:12
| Birmingham, England
|
|-
| Win
| align=center| 1-0
| Glen Reid
| TKO (corner stoppage)
| Cage Rage: Contenders 8
| 
| align=center| 2
| align=center| 1:56
| London, England
|
|-

References

External links 
 Popek Facebook

Grime music artists
Polish rappers
1978 births
Living people
Polish male mixed martial artists
Mixed martial artists utilizing Krav Maga
People from Legnica